Kåre Stokkeland (12 July 1918 – 12 August 1985) was a Norwegian politician for the Labour Party.

He was born in Molde.

He was elected to the Norwegian Parliament from Møre og Romsdal in 1965, and was re-elected on two occasions. He had previously served in the position of deputy representative during the terms 1958–1961 and 1961–1965.

Stokkeland was a member of Bolsøy municipality council and later Molde city council between 1947 and 1967, serving as mayor of Molde during the term 1955–1959. He was also a member of Møre og Romsdal county council during the term 1963–1967.

References

1918 births
1985 deaths
People from Molde
Labour Party (Norway) politicians
Members of the Storting
20th-century Norwegian politicians